The 2003–04 Segunda Liga season was the 14th season of the competition and the 70th season of recognised second-tier football in Portugal.

Overview
The league was contested by 18 teams with GD Estoril Praia winning the championship and gaining promotion to the Primeira Liga along with Vitória Setúbal and FC Penafiel. At the other end of the table SC Covilhã and União Funchal were relegated to the Segunda Divisão along with SC Salgueiros who were relegated for financial reasons.

League standings

Footnotes

External links
 Portugal 2003/04 - RSSSF (Jorge Santos, Jan Schoenmakers and Daniel Dalence)
 Portuguese II Liga 2003/2004 - footballzz.co.uk

Liga Portugal 2 seasons
Port
2003–04 in Portuguese football leagues